Rodopi municipality is situated in the Plovdiv Province, southern Bulgaria.   the population is 33,111.

It occupies parts of the Upper Thracian Plain to the south of Plovdiv and the northernmost slopes of the central Rhodopi mountains.

The backbone of the economy is agriculture which employs around 80% of the population.  Amongst the most important crops are grapes with annual production of 15,000 tonnes.

Demography

Religion
According to the latest Bulgarian census of 2011, the religious composition, among those who answered the optional question on religious identification, was the following: 

Most inhabitants are ethic Bulgarians who belong to the Bulgarian Orthodox Church. The Turkish minority lives mainly in two villages: Branipole and Ustine. Most Turks are also Muslim by religion.

Villages in the Rodopi municipality

 Belashtitsa
 Boykovo
 Branipole
 Brestnik
 Brestovitsa
 Churen
 Dedovo
 Hrabrino
 Izvor
 Kadievo
 Krumovo
 Lilkovo
 Markovo
 Orizari
 Parvenets
 Sitovo
 Skobelevo
 Tsalapitsa
 Ustina
 Yagodovo
 Zlatitrap

References

Municipalities in Plovdiv Province